John Wallace Ridley  (29 April 1919 – 23 August 2006) was a New Zealand Member of Parliament for  in the North Island, a Rhodes Scholar and a civil engineer. He was notable for his contributions to hydro engineering.

Early years
Ridley was born in Invercargill, New Zealand in 1919. He attended Timaru Boys' High School and then studied engineering at Canterbury University College in Christchurch. After the Second World War (in which he served as an engineering officer) he spent two years, 1946–1947, as a Rhodes Scholar at University College, University of Oxford, graduating with an MA (Honours) in engineering science. He married Avis (née Reed) in 1949.

Ridley was a civil engineer of dams for power schemes like Benmore Dam in the South Island and Wairakei in the North Island, working for the Ministry of Works and Development. For his contributions, he was awarded with the Fulton Gold Medal, at the time the highest award of the New Zealand Institution of Engineers.

Political career

Member of Parliament

He was once asked why there were so few engineers in Parliament, to which he replied: "Because engineers are realists and politicians are idealists." In 1975 his wife Avis unsuccessfully sought the Labour Party candidacy for the  electorate alongside 26 other aspirants following the retirement of Hugh Watt, but she lost to Frank Rogers.

Independent
In October 1983 Ridley contested the Labour nomination for the new Tongariro electorate but was unsuccessful, losing to Noel Scott. Ridley disputed the selection process afterwards, claiming that the procedure had been manipulated by the party hierarchy who were determined to select Scott and estimating that he won 250 of the 350 floor votes from the members opposed to less than 20 for Scott. The party president, Jim Anderton, refuted Ridley's claims stating that Labour's selection processes were democratically sound and the decision was final. In the  Ridley stood for the Tongariro electorate as an Independent but was not successful. A large proportion of the Tongariro electorate had been part of Taupo. The city of Taupo itself however had become part of Waikaremoana.

Death
Ridley died in Auckland on 23 August 2006. He was survived by his wife and four sons.

Honours and awards
In 1990, Ridley was awarded the New Zealand 1990 Commemoration Medal. In the 1998 Queen's Birthday Honours, he was appointed a Companion of the Queen's Service Order for public services.

Publications

Notes

References

From Muldoon to Lange: New Zealand Elections in the 1980s by Alan McRobie and Steven Levine (2002, MC Enterprises, Rangiora)

1919 births
2006 deaths
New Zealand Labour Party MPs
Companions of the Queen's Service Order
New Zealand Rhodes Scholars
University of Canterbury alumni
People educated at Timaru Boys' High School
New Zealand civil engineers
New Zealand military personnel of World War II
People from Invercargill
Unsuccessful candidates in the 1981 New Zealand general election
Unsuccessful candidates in the 1984 New Zealand general election
Unsuccessful candidates in the 1975 New Zealand general election
Members of the New Zealand House of Representatives
New Zealand MPs for North Island electorates